Mohammad Al Sarraj, also known as Mohammad Alsarraj (born 6 November 1998 in Amman) is a Jordanian professional squash player. As of February 2018, he was ranked number 92 in the world.

References

1998 births
Living people
Jordanian male squash players
Squash players at the 2014 Asian Games
Asian Games competitors for Jordan
21st-century Jordanian people